Morris Fork is an unincorporated community in Breathitt County, Kentucky. The Morris Fork Presbyterian Church and Community Center, which is listed on the National Register of Historic Places, is located in Morris Fork.

References

Unincorporated communities in Breathitt County, Kentucky
Unincorporated communities in Kentucky